Lo straniero (The Stranger) is an opera (dramma lirico) in two acts composed by Ildebrando Pizzetti, who also wrote the libretto. An original story with characters from the Old Testament, it is the third work in Pizzetti's trilogy on the themes of redemption and the virtue of love. Although it did not receive its premiere until 1930, Pizzetti had begun the project several years earlier. He began the libretto in 1922 and completed it in 1923. The composition of the music was completed in 1925.  The other two works in the trilogy are Dèbora e Jaéle which premiered in 1922 and Fra Gherardo which premiered in 1928.

Performance history
Lo straniero premiered on 29 April, 1930, at the Teatro dell'Opera di Roma. It was subsequently revived there in 1938 and 1955. It was also performed in 1942 at the Teatro Regio di Parma and the Teatro San Carlo in Naples.

Roles

References

External links
Complete libretto (in typewritten manuscript form)

1930 operas
Italian-language operas
Operas
Operas by Ildebrando Pizzetti